Clarence Edward Metzger (born May 23, 1952) is an American former professional baseball player and scout. He played in Major League Baseball as a right-handed pitcher from  through  for the San Francisco Giants, San Diego Padres, St. Louis Cardinals, and the New York Mets.

Professional career
After playing high school baseball at John F. Kennedy high school in Sacramento, California, Metzger was drafted in the 2nd round of the 1970 amateur draft by the San Francisco Giants.

Metzger made his major league debut on September 8, 1974 with the Giants. He played limitedly, pitching 12.7 innings and posting a 3.55 ERA

He was dealt along with Tito Fuentes from the Giants to the Padres for Derrel Thomas at the Winter Meetings on December 6, 1974. Metzger pitched limitedly again, having control issues (he had walked 16 men in his 17.3 innings of career pitching).

In , Metzger was able to successfully control his pitches, and had a great year for a rookie. He posted a 2.92 ERA, along with an 11-4 record, 89 strikeouts, 52 walks and 16 saves in 123.3 innings of work.

With a 0–0 record, a 5.87 ERA and having given up 27 hits in  innings in 17 appearances to start the 1977 season, Metzger was traded from the Padres to the Cardinals for John D'Acquisto and Pat Scanlon on May 17, 1977. Metzger posted better numbers with the Cardinals, collecting 7 saves while posting a 3.11 ERA and a record of 4 wins and 2 losses.

However, Metzger was placed on waivers by the Cardinals and picked up by the New York Mets on April 5, 1978. Metzger had a disappointing season, giving concern to the Mets about his control issues. His contract was subsequently purchased by the Philadelphia Phillies on July 4, 1978 and he was sent back to the minors. Metzger never made it back to the major league level and was released by the Phillies on March 19, 1979.

He works today as a scout.

In his five seasons of baseball, Metzger had an 18-9 record with a 3.74 ERA and 23 saves. He pitched 293.1 innings, gave up 289 hits, walked 140, and struck out 175.

References

External links
, or Retrosheet, or Pelota Binaria (Venezuelan Winter League)

1952 births
Living people
Amarillo Giants players
Baseball players from Indiana
Caracas Metropolitanos players
Cardenales de Lara players
American expatriate baseball players in Venezuela
Decatur Commodores players
Great Falls Giants players
Hawaii Islanders players
Magic Valley Cowboys players
Major League Baseball pitchers
Major League Baseball Rookie of the Year Award winners
New York Mets players
Oklahoma City 89ers players
Phoenix Giants players
Richmond Braves players
Sportspeople from Lafayette, Indiana
San Diego Padres players
San Francisco Giants players
St. Louis Cardinals players
Texas Rangers scouts